Ashok Sharma may refer to:
 Ashok Sharma (actor), Nepalese film actor and director
 Ashok Sharma (born 1950), Indian politician from Madhya Pradesh
 Ashok Sarma, Indian politician from Assam
 Ashok Sharma (cricketer), Indian cricketer